Koki Harada (born 6 August 2000) is a Japanese professional footballer who plays for Gainare Tottori, on loan from Kawasaki Frontale, as a midfielder.

Career
Born in Saitama Prefecture, Harada has played for Kawasaki Frontale and Gainare Tottori.

References

External links

2000 births
Living people
Association football people from Saitama Prefecture
Japanese footballers
Kawasaki Frontale players
Gainare Tottori players
J3 League players
Association football midfielders